Ghetto Gospel is the debut studio album by American rapper and singer Rod Wave. It was released on November 1, 2019, by Alamo Records and distributed by Interscope Records. It features guest appearances from Kevin Gates and Lil Durk. The former also served as executive producer during production. The album peaked at number ten on the US Billboard 200. The album was certified platinum by the Recording Industry Association of America (RIAA).

Ghetto Gospel was met with generally positive reviews. At Album of the Year, the album received an average score of 68 out of 100, based on two reviews.

Commercial performance
Ghetto Gospel debuted at number 14 on the US Billboard 200 chart, earning a total of 24.8 millions audio on-demand streams in its first week. In its second week, the album climbed to number ten on the chart, earning an additional 27,000 album-equivalent units, which was a 24% increase from its debut week sales. On May 20, 2020, the album was certified gold by the Recording Industry Association of America (RIAA) for combined sales and album-equivalent units of over 500,000 units in the United States.

Track listing

Charts

Weekly charts

Year-end charts

Certifications

References 

2019 debut albums
Rod Wave albums